Francis George Mann,  (6 September 1917 – 8 August 2001) was an English cricketer, who played for Cambridge University, Middlesex and England. He was born at Byfleet, Surrey and died at Stockcross, Berkshire.

As a cricketer, George Mann was a right-handed middle-order batsman. His father, Frank Mann, also captained England, making them the first father and son to both captain England. Colin and Chris Cowdrey are the only other father and son to have done this for England.

Early life and education
Mann was born on 6 September 1917 in Byfleet, Surrey, England. The son of Frank Mann, he was the brother of John Pelham Mann. He was educated at Eton College, an all-boys public school, and captained the school's cricket XI in 1936. He was also a member of the Eton College Contingent of the Officer Training Corps, and reached the rank of cadet under-officer. He studied at Pembroke College, Cambridge, graduating with a Bachelor of Arts (BA) degree. While at Cambridge, he earned two cricketing blues, having represented the university in 1938 and 1939.

Military service
Mann served in the British Army during the Second World War, having joined up before the outbreak of war. On 8 July 1939, he was commissioned in the Royal Welch Fusiliers as a second lieutenant. He transferred to the Scots Guards on 13 March 1940. He was awarded the Military Cross (MC) in 1942. On 28 June 1945, the then temporary major Mann was awarded the Distinguished Service Order (DSO) "in recognition of gallant and distinguished services in Italy".

Mann maintained his links with the army after the war. On 8 July 1949, he was moved from the Supplementary Reserve of Officers to the Regular Army Reserve of Officers, and was granted the honorary rank of major. Having reached the age limit, he resigned his commission on 6 September 1967 and was permitted to retain his honorary rank.

Cricketing career
Mann captained England in each of his seven Test matches, winning two, and drawing the other five; his father had also been captain in every Test he played in. Wisden said of Mann: "as a captain he was ideal, zealous to a degree, and considerate in all things at all times". After leading England in South Africa in 1948/49, Mann led his side for two Tests in the following summer, before he stood down, citing inability to participate regularly due to his family's brewing business commitments (Mann, Crossman & Paulin).

Mann was chairman of the Test and County Cricket Board (TCCB) from 1978 to 1983. He was therefore chairman during the controversy over the rebel tour which Geoff Boycott and Graham Gooch led to South Africa in 1982.

Later life
Mann was a main board director and retained his position on the new company board when his family brewery merged with Watney Combe & Reid in 1958. He was non-executive Deputy Chairman of the Extel Group from 1980 to 1986.

Mann died on 8 August 2001 in Stockcross, Berkshire, England.

Personal life
In 1949, Mann married Margaret Hildegarde Marshall Clark. Together they had four children: three sons and one daughter. His wife predeceased him, dying in 1995.

Mann's son, Simon, was sentenced for thirty-four years in Equatorial Guinea in 2008, on charges related to an attempted coup in 2004, but was pardoned on 2 November 2009.

References

External links

1917 births
2001 deaths
England Test cricket captains
Middlesex cricket captains
Cambridge University cricketers
Free Foresters cricketers
Chairmen of Middlesex County Cricket Club
Presidents of Middlesex County Cricket Club
Presidents of the Marylebone Cricket Club
Scots Guards officers
British Army personnel of World War II
Commanders of the Order of the British Empire
Companions of the Distinguished Service Order
Recipients of the Military Cross
Masters of the Worshipful Company of Brewers
People educated at Eton College
Alumni of Pembroke College, Cambridge
Gentlemen cricketers
Marylebone Cricket Club cricketers
Gentlemen of England cricketers
Royal Welch Fusiliers officers
English cricketers
Middlesex cricketers
Military personnel from Surrey
North v South cricketers
20th-century English businesspeople
Marylebone Cricket Club South African Touring Team cricketers
England Test cricketers